Dan Christer Glans (born 2 May 1947) is a Swedish steeplechase runner. He competed in the men's 3000 metres steeplechase at the 1976 Summer Olympics.

References

1947 births
Living people
Athletes (track and field) at the 1976 Summer Olympics
Swedish male steeplechase runners
Olympic athletes of Sweden
Place of birth missing (living people)